Oita often refers to:
Ōita Prefecture, Kyushu, Japan
Ōita (city), the capital of the prefecture

Oita or Ōita may also refer to:

Places
Ōita District, Ōita, a former district in Ōita Prefecture, Japan
Ōita Stadium, a multi-use stadium in Ōita, Ōita Prefecture, Japan
Oița River, a tributary of the Bistriţa River in Romania
Roman Catholic Diocese of Oita, a diocese in the city of Ōita in the Ecclesiastical province of Nagasaki, Japan
Mount Oeta (also "Oita" or "Oiti"), a mountain in Central Greece

Education
Oita Junior College, a private junior college in Ōita, Ōita Prefecture, Japan
Oita Prefectural College of Arts and Culture, a private junior college in Ōita, Ōita Prefecture, Japan
Oita University, a national university in Ōita, Ōita Prefecture, Japan
Oita University of Nursing and Health Sciences, a public university in Ōita, Ōita Prefecture, Japan

Transportation
Oita Airport, an airport in Kunisaki, Ōita Prefecture, Japan 
Ōita Station, a JR Kyūshū train station in Ōita, Ōita Prefecture, Japan

Companies
Oita Asahi Broadcasting, a Japanese broadcast network in Oita Prefecture, Japan
Oita Broadcasting System, a television company based in Ōita Prefecture, Japan

People
Koichi Oita (1914–1996), former Japanese football (soccer) player and manager

Sports and entertainment
Oita Miyoshi Weisse Adler, a men's volleyball team based in Ōita, Ōita Prefecture, Japan
Oita Trinita, a J. League football (soccer) team in Ōita, Ōita Prefecture, Japan

Biology
Oita salamander, a species of salamander in the family Hynobiidae endemic to Japan